The Miss South Africa 2016 took place on March 19, 2016 at the Carnival City's Big Top Arena, in a contest where twelve contestants from different provinces competed for the crown. The winner, Ntandoyenkosi Kunene from Mkhondo, was crowned by the outgoing title holder, Liesl Laurie (Miss South Africa 2015). Kunene represented South Africa at Miss Universe 2016 and Miss World 2016 pageants.

Winner and runners-up
Color keys

Top 12

Judges 
 Miss South Africa 1994, Basetsana Kumalo
 Poet and writer, Kojo Baffoe
 Actress and TV Host, Sophie Ndaba
 Fashion designer, Casper Bosman
 Magazine editor, Pnina Fenster

Crossovers 
Contestants who previously competed or will be competing at international beauty pageants: 

Miss World
2016:  Mpumalanga – Ntandoyenkosi Kunene (Unplaced)
 (Washington)

Miss Universe
2016:  Mpumalanga – Ntandoyenkosi Kunene (Unplaced)
 (Pasay)

Miss International
2017:  Gauteng – Tayla Skye Robinson (Top 15)
 (Tokyo)
2018:  Gauteng – Reabetswe Rambi Sechoaro (2nd Runner-Up)
 (Tokyo)

Miss Africa Calabar
2017:  Eastern Cape – Luyolo Mngonyama (2nd Runner-Up)
 (Calabar)

References

External links

2016
2016 beauty pageants
2016 in South Africa
March 2016 events in South Africa